is a town located in Iwate Prefecture, Japan. , the town had an estimated population of 5,315, and a population density of 16 persons per km² in 2142 households.

Geography
Sumita is located in a basin in southeastern Iwate Prefecture in the southern Kitakami Mountains, surrounded by peaks with an elevation of between 600 and 1500 meters an all sides. Approximately 90% of the town’s area is covered by forest and mountains.

Neighboring municipalities
Iwate Prefecture
Ōfunato
Rikuzentakata
Ichinoseki
Tōno
Kamaishi
Ōshū

Climate
Sumita has a humid climate (Köppen climate classification Dfa) with warm summers and cold winters. The average annual temperature in Sumita is 10.4 °C. The average annual rainfall is 1379 mm with September as the wettest month and January as the driest month. The temperatures are highest on average in August, at around 23.1 °C, and lowest in January, at around -1.2 °C.

Demographics
Per Japanese census data, the population of Sumita peaked in the 1950s and has declined over the past 60 years. It is now much less than it was a century ago.

History
The area of present-day Sumita was part of ancient Mutsu Province. It was under the control of the Date clan during the Edo period, who ruled the Sendai Domain under the Tokugawa shogunate.

The villages of Kamiarisu, Shimoarisu and Setamai within Kesen District were created on April 1, 1889, with the establishment of the modern municipalities system. Setamai became a town on April 29, 1940. Kamiarisu and Shimoarisu merged with Setamai on April 1, 1955 to create the town of Sumita.

Government
Sumita has a mayor-council form of government with a directly elected mayor and a unicameral town council of 12 members. Sumita, together with the city of Rikuzentakata contributes one seat to the Iwate Prefectural legislature. In terms of national politics, the town is part of Iwate 2nd district of the lower house of the Diet of Japan.

Economy
The local economy consists largely of forestry and agriculture, with pig farming contributing to over half of the town's agricultural production.

Education
Sumita has two public elementary schools and two public middle schools operated by the local board of education. There is one public high school operated by the Iwate Prefectural Board of Education.

Transportation

Railway
 East Japan Railway Company (JR East) -  Kamaishi Line

Highway

References

External links

Official Website 

 
Towns in Iwate Prefecture